M.O.M.S — Mhies on a Mission (simply M.O.M.s or Mhies on a Mission) is a Philippine talk show broadcast by All TV, hosted by Ruffa Gutierrez, Mariel Padilla and Ciara Sotto. It debuted on November 28, 2022.

Gutierrez announced during the media conference of their upcoming film Martyr or Murderer that the show will paused on couple of months.

References

All TV (Philippines) original programming
2020s Philippine television series
2022 Philippine television series debuts
Breakfast television in the Philippines
Filipino-language television shows
Philippine television talk shows
Television shows filmed in the Philippines